Gloria Marshall (August 27, 1931 – December 18, 1994) was an American actress seen on television in the 1950s in mainly small parts. She portrayed Evelyn Phelps in the 1954 episode, "Husband Pro-Tem", of the anthology series, Death Valley Days, hosted by Stanley Andrews, with Jock Mahoney in the starring role as engineer Andy Prentis.

Marshall also appeared in The Beverly Hillbillies and Sea Hunt and The Bob Cummings Show. She was in two films, Escape to Burma (1955) and Roadraceers'' (1959).

Filmography

Selected Television

References

External links
 

American television actresses
1931 births
1994 deaths
20th-century American actresses